John Page (21 October 1934 – 2 July 2006) was an English footballer. Born in Frimley Green, Surrey, Page played the majority of his professional career with Football League club Southampton, before later moving to Hastings United for his final season. He also managed Camberley Town between 1967 and 1970. Originally an outside-left, Page played primarily as a centre-half and occasionally as a right-back.

Playing career
John Page played youth football for Mytchett Boys, before he was signed in October 1951 by Southampton coach Jimmy Eason on the recommendation of Mytchett manager "Busty" Wells. At the age of 18, Page made his debut against Sheffield United on 8 November 1952, playing at outside-left alongside Ted Bates, although he quickly converted to a centre-half.

In the 1959–60 season, Page played at centre-half in all but one game in the Third Division, establishing himself as the side's first-choice penalty taker ahead of free-kick specialist Terry Paine and top scorer George O'Brien; he converted a total of 21 penalties in his career, a club record until it was topped by Mick Channon, David Peach, Matthew Le Tissier, and Rickie Lambert. As the Saints gained promotion to the Second Division, Page kept his place in the starting lineup and played the first 40 games of the campaign, before the arrival and establishment of Tony Knapp prompted him to leave the club.

Despite interest from fellow Football League side Torquay United, Page made the step down to the Southern League to join Hastings United in June 1962. He only spent one season at United, and due to a problem with his weight played mostly for the reserve side, retiring from professional playing at the end of the campaign.

Managerial career
After retiring from playing and holding a "variety of jobs" in his local area, Page was brought in as the manager for Camberley Town in June 1967. Despite the club establishing a "more stable financial base", Page was unable to bring the club success and resigned from his post in June 1970.

Career statistics

References

1934 births
2006 deaths
English footballers
Association football defenders
Southampton F.C. players
Hastings United F.C. (1948) players
English Football League players
Southern Football League players
English football managers
Camberley Town F.C. managers